Rostraver Airport  is a public use airport in Westmoreland County, Pennsylvania, United States.

Geography 
It is located five nautical miles (9 km) east of the central business district of Monongahela, Pennsylvania in Rostraver Township. It is operated by the Westmoreland County Airport Authority, which also operates the Arnold Palmer Regional Airport in Unity Township, Pennsylvania.

This airport is assigned a three-letter location identifier of FWQ by the Federal Aviation Administration, but it does not have an International Air Transport Association (IATA) airport code.

Facilities and aircraft 
It has one asphalt paved runway designated 8/26 which measures 4,001 by 75 feet (1,220 x 23 m).

For the 12-month period ending April 22, 2009, the airport had 43,542 aircraft operations, an average of 119 per day: 98% general aviation, 2% air taxi and <1% military. At that time there were 113 aircraft based at this airport: 84% single-engine, 11% multi-engine, 4% helicopter, 1% glider and 1% ultralight.

References

External links 

 Westmoreland County Airport Authority
 Rostraver Airport (P53) at Pennsylvania DOT Bureau of Aviation
 

Airports in Pennsylvania
County airports in Pennsylvania
Transportation buildings and structures in Westmoreland County, Pennsylvania